The 1977–78 I liga was the 52nd season of the Polish Football Championship and the 44th season of the I liga, the top Polish professional league for association football clubs, since its establishment in 1927. The league was operated by the Polish Football Association (PZPN).

The champions were Wisła Kraków, who won their 5th Polish title and 6th Polish league title (in the 1951 season Wisła Kraków finished in the first position and became the league champion, but in that season, the I liga was not a competition for the title of the Polish Champion. Before the season Polish Football Association decided that Champion of Poland title will be awarded to the winner of the Polish Cup, which was later Ruch Chorzów).

Competition modus
The season started on 20 July 1977 and concluded on 2 May 1978 (autumn-spring league). The season was played as a round-robin tournament. The team at the top of the standings won the league title. A total of 16 teams participated, 14 of which competed in the league during the 1976–77 season, while the remaining two were promoted from the 1976–77 II liga. Each team played a total of 30 matches, half at home and half away, two games against each other team. Teams received two points for a win and one point for a draw.

League table

Results

Top goalscorers

Notes

References

Bibliography

External links
 Poland – List of final tables at RSSSF 
 List of Polish football championships 
 History of the Polish League 
 List of Polish football championships 

Ekstraklasa seasons
1977–78 in Polish football
Pol